Napoleon is a 2002 historical miniseries which explored the life of Napoleon Bonaparte. It was the most expensive television miniseries in Europe up to that time, costing an equivalent of (USD) $46,330,000 to produce. The miniseries covered Napoleon's military successes and failures, including the battles of Austerlitz, Eylau, and Waterloo and the retreat from Russia. It also delved into Napoleon's personal life: his marriage to and divorce from Josephine de Beauharnais, his marriage to Marie Louise, the Duchess of Parma and daughter of Francis II, and his affairs with Eleanore Denuelle and Marie Walewska. The series draws from Max Gallo's biography.

The miniseries was produced by GMT Productions in France and co-produced by Transfilm in Canada and Spice Factory in the UK. In France it first aired October 7, 2002 on France 2, in Quebec it ran from February 2 to February 23, 2003 on Super Écran and was then re-aired on Télévision de Radio-Canada. In the United States, it aired on the Arts and Entertainment (A&E) channel.

Plot
The series begins with Napoleon imprisoned on Saint Helena. The episode then goes back to show Napoleon’s first meeting the widow Josephine de Beauharnais. The story then follows his career breakthrough, the suppression of Royalist rioters on 13 Vendémiaire (1795). Later, Napoleon is shown at the Battle of Arcole (1796). It continues with the couple inspecting their future house, Château de Malmaison, and shows Napoleon allying with Talleyrand and Fouché. It moves to the French campaign in Egypt and Syria (1798–1801), the Coup of 18 Brumaire (1799), and ends with the Plot of the rue Saint-Nicaise (1800).

The second episode begins in 1804 with the controversial arrest and execution of the duc d'Enghien, followed by the elevation of members of the House of Bonaparte, and Napoleon's imperial coronation. There is an extended sequence showing the Battle of Austerlitz (1805), followed by a brief scene of the Battle of Jena-Auerstedt (1806). Napoleon's affair with Maria Walewska is also shown, as are the troubles with his wife. It ends with the Battle of Eylau (1807), with Napoleon waiting desperately for the reinforcements led by Marshal Michel Ney.

The third episode begins with the timely arrival of Ney at Eylau. Napoleon then concludes a short-lived peace treaty with Alexander at Tilsit as the costly Peninsular War starts and troubles with his family and imperial succession begin to dominate. Next is the defeat at the Battle of Aspern-Essling (1809) and his marriage to the Duchess of Parma in 1810 and the birth of a son in 1811. Napoleon, feeling provoked by the Russians, invades in 1812 and watches from the Kremlin as Moscow ignites.

The final episode begins with the bitter retreat from Russia. Sensing France's weakness, the War of the Sixth Coalition erupts in 1813, and, outnumbered, Napoleon's forces are reduced and Paris is taken in 1814. After attempting suicide, and being forced to abdicate, he becomes the sovereign of Elba. Later, there is the Hundred Days, culminating with the Battle of Waterloo (1815) and the defeat of the imperial forces. It ends with Napoleon dying in exile on the island of Saint Helena in 1821.

Cast

 Christian Clavier as Napoléon Bonaparte
 Isabella Rossellini as Joséphine de Beauharnais
 Gérard Depardieu as Joseph Fouché
 John Malkovich as Charles Talleyrand
 Anouk Aimée as Letizia Bonaparte
 Heino Ferch as Armand Augustin Louis de Caulaincourt
 Sebastian Koch as Marshal Jean Lannes
 Ennio Fantastichini as Joseph Bonaparte
 Yves Jacques as Lucien Bonaparte
 Alexandra Maria Lara as Countess Marie Walewska
 Toby Stephens as Alexander I of Russia
 Mavie Hörbiger as Marie Louise of Austria
 Marie Bäumer as Caroline Bonaparte
 Claudio Amendola as Marshal Joachim Murat
 Julian Sands as Klemens von Metternich
 Ludivine Sagnier as Hortense de Beauharnais
 John Wood as Pope Pius VII
 Natacha Amal as Madame Bertrand
 Charlotte Valandrey as Madame Coigny
 Florence Pernel as Thérésa Tallien
 Jessica Paré as Eléanore Denuelle
 Tamsin Egerton-Dick as Lucia Elizabeth "Miss Betsy" Balcombe
 David La Haye as Louis-Antoine-Henri de Bourbon-Condé, duc d'Enghien
 David Francis as Sir Hudson Lowe
 Jacky Nercessian as Roustam Raza
 Guillaume Depardieu as Jean-Baptiste Muiron
 Alain Doutey as Marshal Michel Ney
 Serge Dupire as Pierre Cambronne
 Philippe Volter as Paul Barras
 Vincent Grass as Charles IV of Spain
 Jean Dell as Malmaison's player

Production
Filming took place in Austria, Canada, the Czech Republic, France, Hungary, Morocco and Switzerland. The filmmakers found that many locations in Hungary resembled 19th century France. However, matte paintings and various digital effects were also employed in post-production in order to recreate the historical setting. In many of the battle sequences, computer-generated soldiers created by Hybride Technologies were added into the footage. The fact that Napoleon left behind many historical records helped in the production, and other records were supplied by the modern-day French Army.

Historical accuracy
 
 In the first episode, during the Plot of the Rue Saint-Nicaise, Napoleon is seen travelling alongside his wife, but in reality Joséphine was riding in a separate carriage.
 In the third episode, Napoleon and Tsar Alexander are shown in 1808 at the Congress of Erfurt listening to a performance of Nicolo Paganini's Caprice No. 24. In reality the piece was composed in 1817.
As shown in episode three, the dressing down of Talleyrand during which Napoleon claimed that he was "shit in a silk stocking" occurred in front of Napoleon's marshals rather than in private chambers. By this time, Talleyrand had also already resigned his office, rather than being fired.
 In the fourth episode, Talleyrand warns King Louis XVIII that Napoleon and his army are advancing on Paris. In reality, Talleyrand was at the Congress of Vienna at the time.
In another scene, Murat is seen offering his services to Napoleon once more for the upcoming Waterloo campaign, but in real life, Murat had actually done so through a dispatch and not in person, as the last time the two actually saw each other was in Germany in 1813 following Napoleon's defeat at the Battle of Leipzig.
Cambronne is seen saying the infamous word of Cambronne and later a variation of his famous response about the Guard during the Battle of Waterloo. The accuracy of these words is disputed, though they are popularly attributed to him.

Reception
The series premiered at a time when many other books and films about Napoleon had recently come out or were in production, including a stage production called C'était Bonaparte, which opened days before the miniseries premiered. Upon its release, it was the first television series to be broadcast simultaneously in all the participating European countries. However, when originally broadcast in the United States, it was edited down to a running time of three hours, as opposed to the original six hours.

When it first aired in France it drew in seven million nightly viewers. Critical reviews have been mixed. Some reviewers were uneasy at the casting of Christian Clavier, an actor known mostly for his work in comedy films, in the title role. French critics generally found Clavier to be "a good Napoleon but a poor Bonaparte." That is, striking an imposing figure but failing to give insight into the man. In terms of the dispute over whether Napoleon was a visionary, a tyrant, or an imposter, historian Jean Tulard considers the miniseries to be "too soft" on the emperor. However, the series also endows him with some unsavory characteristics, including a certain insensitivity towards the human costs of war. Clavier himself referred to the character he portrays as an intellectual and a true liberal.

Anthony Nield of DVD Times criticized the series's pacing. John Lichfield of the Independent found the battle scenes inconsistent in terms of realism.

Controversy
The series was praised in France, but received negative reviews in Italy. Italian politician, Umberto Bossi, was angered by the series, stating that it glamorized Napoleon despite the fact that his occupation of Italy resulted in the deaths of hundreds of thousands and the looting of many of the country's artistic treasures. He also criticized Italy's RAI television network for co-funding the series. Producer and cast member Gérard Depardieu defended the series, stating that it keeps to the truth and that "perhaps Bossi would have preferred an idiot Napoleon." Two other members of the cast, Clavier and Rossellini, vouched for the integrity of their respective portrayals of the French emperor and empress. Lichfield, on the other hand, says that the series omits most of the unsavory elements of Napoleon's Italian campaign.

Awards
In 2003, the series won a Bavarian TV award. In France, it won a 7 d'Or award for Best Director. In the United States, it was nominated for nine Emmy awards, and it won the Emmy for Outstanding Costumes for a Miniseries, Movie or a Special

DVD release
A three-disc DVD (full screen) recording, under the A&E label and with A&E extra features, is sold in the United States. In Canada, there is a four-disc DVD (fullscreen) recording, under the REMSTAR label and without the A&E extra features, in both English and French editions. French edition is in 1.78:1 (16:9) widescreen.

Video game
A Risk-style video game based on the miniseries, titled Napoleon, was released on November 14, 2002 by Atari and Infogrames for Mac and Windows. The game allows players to recreate some of Napoleon's historical battles. Richard Grégoire, the composer of the soundtrack of the miniseries, also contributed a part of the game's music.

References

External links
 
 An article about the special effects from Computer Graphics World

2000s French television miniseries
2002 French television series debuts
2002 French television series endings
Cultural depictions of Napoleon
Cultural depictions of Charles Maurice de Talleyrand-Périgord
Cultural depictions of Klemens von Metternich
Cultural depictions of Joséphine de Beauharnais
Napoleonic Wars in fiction
Peabody Award-winning television programs
Period television series
Television shows directed by Yves Simoneau
Television shows filmed in Austria
Television shows filmed in the Czech Republic
Television shows filmed in Hungary
Television shows filmed in Morocco
Television shows filmed in Switzerland